Ringsted may refer to:

Ringsted, a city in Denmark
Ringsted municipality, a municipality containing the city of Ringsted, Denmark
Ringsted-Hallen, an indoor sports arena in the city of Ringsted, Denmark
Ringsted, Iowa, a city in the United States

See also 
Ringstead (disambiguation)